Labuat was Spanish music band, formed in 2008 by the music duo The Pinker Tones, publicist Risto Mejide and Operación Triunfo 2008 winner Virginia Maestro.

Risto Mejide is a songwriter for the group,  The Pinker Tones are the producers and Virginia contributes mainly with her vocals, although she also writes some of the band's songs and lyrics.
The band was formed when Virginia won the contest OT 2008. Risto Mejide, whose songs had been composed many years ago, realized Virginia was "the voice he had been waiting for those songs for so many years" during the contest castings. Risto talked to The Pinker Tones and accorded to record the album when Virginia left the contest.

In 2009, Labuat released their self-titled debut album, which peaked at number 2 on the Spanish charts. So far, three singles, "Soy tu aire", "De pequeño" and "Carta de otoño", have been released. In May 2009 the band was the opening act for Beyoncé Knowles in Barcelona, during her I Am... World Tour.

In 2010 the band disbanded, but Virginia Maestro continued solo as Virginia Labuat.

Discography

Albums

Singles

References

External links
 Página Oficial

Spanish musical groups